Hillsdale is an unincorporated community in Helt Township, Vermillion County, in the U.S. state of Indiana.

History
A post office has been in operation at Hillsdale since 1872. The town was laid out in 1873.  The community was so named on account of its lofty elevation. Its early businesses were located at the bottom of the hill, near the railroad depot, but most of the houses were built higher up on the hillside.  This elevation difference complicated movement between the two sections of the community, so in 1903 the Hillsdale Steps were built on the hillside to improve foot transportation.

Geography
Hillsdale is located at  (39.782020, -87.388270) on the western banks of the Wabash River.

Trivia
The 1994 children's film Blank Check was set in a fictionalized version of Hillsdale which seems to be a major city rather than the true-life community. However, the movie was filmed in and around Austin, Texas.

References

Unincorporated communities in Vermillion County, Indiana
Unincorporated communities in Indiana
Terre Haute metropolitan area